Mier was a local municipality within the ZF Mgcawu District Municipality in the Northern Cape province of South Africa. Its area includes the South African portion of one of the world's largest conservation areas, the Kgalagadi Transfrontier Park. The main settlement in the municipality is the town of Rietfontein.

According to the 2011 census Mier has a population of 7,003, which is the smallest of any municipality in South Africa. Mier is the municipality in South Africa with the highest percentage of Afrikaans speakers at 97.1%.

The name Mier is an Afrikaans word that originates from the word "mere" which means "lakes". When German missionaries visited the area a long time ago, they found the pans in the area full of water. They called them "mere". As language changed, the people later pronounced it as "mier".

After municipal elections on 3 August 2016 it was merged with the //Khara Hais Local Municipality to form the Dawid Kruiper Local Municipality.

Main places
The 2011 census divided the municipality into the following main places:

Other villages and populated places in the municipality include Bokspits, Brsdring, Andriesvale and Tweerivieren.

Politics 
The municipal council consisted of seven members elected by mixed-member proportional representation. Four councillors were elected by first-past-the-post voting in four wards, while the remaining three were chosen from party lists so that the total number of party representatives was proportional to the number of votes received. In the election of 18 May 2011 the African National Congress (ANC) won a majority of four seats on the council.
The following table shows the results of the election.

References

External links
 Official website

2016 disestablishments in South Africa
Former local municipalities of South Africa
Populated places disestablished in 2016
Dawid Kruiper Local Municipality